Palgongsan, also Palgong Mountain, and previously called Gongsan during the Goryeo dynasty, is a mountain in southeastern South Korea, lying on an outlier of the Taebaek range.  It stands on the northeastern border between Daegu metropolitan city and North Gyeongsang province (including the districts of Chilgok County, Gunwi County, Yeongcheon, and Gyeongsan).  Its peak is 1193 m above sea level.

The mountain is the site of a number of cultural and natural heritage sites.  These include Buddhist shrines from the Silla period or later, including the large and active temple of Donghwasa and the Gunwi Triad Budda Grotto (National Treasure 109).  In addition, in 927 the Battle of Gong Mountain was fought between Hubaekje and Goryeo forces on the mountain's southern slope.

Natural treasures include the standing stone of Gatbawi, so called from its resemblance to a traditional Korean horsehair hat, or gat.

The mountain, connected to downtown Daegu by bus, is a popular site for weekend outings from the city.  Portions of the mountain were designated a provincial park in 1980.

Trail 

 Palgongsan Olleh-gil: This trail follows the apple orchards filled with Pyeonggwang Apples at the foot of Mount Palgong. The trail takes about three hours to hike in total. This route starts from the Hyoja tree Gangsunhang at the entrance of Pyeonggwang-dong, and hike through the small reservoir of Pyeonggwangji finally arriving at the Moyeongjae, which is a house where the stone monument of General Shin Sung-gyeom stands. The time to visit this trail is in the spring (April–May) when visitors can see the apple blossoms, and in the fall when the apples are ready to be picked. As follow the apple orchards along the valleys, visitors will find Cheombaekdang, which is a house built for the spirit of hyoja (devoted son) Woo Hyo-jung and seonbi (scholar) Woo Myeong-sik.

Course: Pyeonggwang-dong entrance - Pyeonggwang Elementary School - Pyeonggwangji - Moyeongjae - Jaebau farm - Cheombaekdang - Pyeonggwang station (Round-trip 4.6 miles, 2 hours 30 minutes. Level: Easy)

See also

 List of mountains in Korea

References

Mountains of Daegu
Mountains of North Gyeongsang Province
Dong District, Daegu
Chilgok County
Gunwi County
Yeongcheon
Gyeongsan